Basketballgemeinschaft Göttingen is a German basketball club based in Göttingen, Germany. In 2010, the club won the EuroChallenge against Krasnye Krylya Samara from Russia. The team had played in Germany's second division nearly every season since its foundation up to the 2006–07 season, in which Göttingen played in the Basketball Bundesliga.

History
When the club BG 74 Göttingen promoted to the Basketball Bundesliga in 2007, the professional team was separated from the club. In its first Bundesliga season, Göttingen managed to avoid relegation. In the following years the club would have some excellent performances, with consecutive playoff appearances. In the 2009–10 season, Göttingen made its debut in Europe by playing in the EuroChallenge. The team immediately made its mark as it won the competition after having a 13–3 record overall. In the Final Four, which was hosted by Göttingen, the club beat Russian side Krasnye Krylia 83–75 in the Final. In the following two seasons the club played in Europe as well. However, in the 2011–12 season Göttingen were relegated from the German second division ProA. In 2014, the team returned to the Bundesliga, when it took the ProA title by beating the Crailsheim Merlins in the Finals.

Honours

Domestic competitions
2. Basketball Bundesliga / ProA:
Winners: 2006–07, 2013–14

European competitions
EuroChallenge:
Winners: 2009–10

Team

Current roster

Notable players

 Kyle Bailey
 James L. Dickey III
 Jeb Ivey
 Trenton Meacham
 Taylor Rochestie
  Nicholas Livas
  Will Rayman

Season by season

References

External links

Basketball teams established in 1974
1974 establishments in Germany
Basketball clubs in Lower Saxony
Göttingen